Westport is a historic neighborhood in Kansas City, Missouri, USA. Originally an independent town, it was annexed by Kansas City in 1897. It is one of Kansas City's main entertainment districts.

Westport has a lending library, a branch of the Kansas City Public Library.

History

Westport was first settled by Reverend Isaac McCoy and his family in 1831. It was located approximately three miles due south of the present day location of downtown Kansas City, Missouri.  It was platted three years later, and formally incorporated in February 1857. McCoy's son John Calvin McCoy is generally considered the "father of Kansas City" after he formally founded the town. He had supplies landed at a rocky point on the Missouri River between Grand and Main streets, which became known as "Westport's Landing."  When the landing became popular, young McCoy and other residents banded together to form the "Town of Kansas" company to buy the land. Westport's Indian trade extended to the Great Plains and Rocky Mountains. 

By 1850, Westport and Kansas City displaced Independence as an outfitting and starting point for traders, trappers, and emigrants heading west on the Santa Fe and Oregon trails. The town's greatest prosperity came between 1854 and 1860. During the Civil War, there were many skirmishes between pro- and anti-slavery groups in the area, and the Civil War's Battle of Westport was fought there in October 1864. Unfortunately, after the war, trade fell off sharply and never recovered, and by 1899, Kansas City annexed Westport.

The historic Nutterville area, east of Broadway Street, was developed by James B. Nutter Sr. who ensured that its old homes were adapted as business offices in order to restore them. The houses are colorfully painted and landscaped.

See also
California Trail, Oregon Trail
National Register of Historic Places listings in Jackson County, Missouri
List of neighborhoods in Kansas City, Missouri
St. Paul's Episcopal Day School
Westport High School
Harris-Kearney House

References

Bibliography

External links

Westport Historical Society
Notebooks of James Gillespie Hamilton (a Westport merchant), from the Library of Congress website

Populated places established in 1831
Kansas City metropolitan area
Oregon Trail
Neighborhoods in Kansas City, Missouri
History of Kansas City, Missouri
Tourist attractions in Jackson County, Missouri
Tourist attractions in Kansas City, Missouri
Former municipalities in Missouri